The Nashville Financial Historic District or Wall Street of the South is a historic district in downtown Nashville, Tennessee. It was listed on the National Register of Historic Places listings in Davidson County, Tennessee (NRHP) in 2002.

History
Buildings in the district were constructed from 1900-1974. The district boundaries are Third Avenue North and Union Street. The district was once known as the Wall Street of the South because it has four large bank buildings. The buildings are: the 1926 Nashville Bank and Trust Company building designed by architectural firm Asmus & Clark, The opulent Nashville Trust building, the 1926 American Trust Building designed by Henry C. Hibbs and the 1922 Federal Reserve Bank Building. The district helped Nashville to become a regional banking center.

NRHP
The District was added to the National Register of Historic Places listings in Davidson County, Tennessee on March 20, 2002.

References

National Register of Historic Places in Nashville, Tennessee
Historic districts on the National Register of Historic Places in Tennessee
Neighborhoods in Nashville, Tennessee
Populated places in Davidson County, Tennessee